Paenemarmota is an extinct genus of ground squirrel from North America. Fossils are known from the Blancan and Hemphillian age from localities in Nebraska, Kansas, Texas, Arizona, and Mexico. At around the size of a beaver, Paenemarmota is the largest known member of the squirrel family.

Description
Paenemarmota is the largest known ground squirrel and is nearly twice as large as the largest living marmots.
 
Although some of its features are primitive, in general morphology it resembles the ground squirrels of the genus Spermophilus. The large upper and lower fourth premolars are proportionally very large, a feature shared with modern marmots. The large fourth premolars are exceptions to the general evolutionary trend in the ground squirrels and only in Paenemarmota and the living Marmota are these teeth larger than the first molars.

References

Ground squirrels
Miocene rodents
Pliocene rodents
Pleistocene rodents
Prehistoric mammals of North America
Prehistoric rodent genera